Ronnie Heard (born October 5, 1976) is a former American football safety in the National Football League. He was signed by the San Francisco 49ers as an undrafted free agent in 2000. He played college football at Mississippi.

Heard also played for the Atlanta Falcons.

Professional career

San Francisco 49ers
Heard signed with the San Francisco 49ers as an undrafted free agent in 2000. He played for the 49ers from 2000 to 2004. In his five years with the team he started 24 of 69 games, recording 182 tackles, 3.5 sacks, and six interceptions.

Atlanta Falcons
Heard spent one year with the Atlanta Falcons in 2005 after signing with them as an unrestricted free agent. In his only year with the team he started 5 of 12 games making 29 tackles.

Personal
Heard and his wife, LaToya have three children; two girls (Kaitlyn and Parker) and one son (Reid).  Both are alumni of the University of Mississippi (Ole Miss), and have been married since A

References

1976 births
Living people
People from Bay City, Texas
American football safeties
Ole Miss Rebels football players
San Francisco 49ers players
Atlanta Falcons players